So Kon Po or Sookunpo is an area of Hong Kong Island located south of Causeway Bay and Victoria Park in Hong Kong. It neighbours Caroline Hill and Jardine's Lookout.

It contains the Hong Kong Stadium, Olympic House, and the Tung Wah Eastern Hospital. So Kon Po was the burial grounds for the victims of the Happy Valley Racecourse fire in 1918. The remains were moved to Aberdeen in 1953, when the stadium was built on its grounds.

Education 
The Hong Kong government-operated Sir Ellis Kadoorie (Sookunpo) Primary School is located in So Kon Po. It was formerly both a primary and secondary school. In 1980 the Kadoorie School was divided into separate schools for primary and secondary levels. Sir Ellis Kadoorie Secondary School (West Kowloon) opened in 2000, taking secondary levels. Kadoorie School previously had separate shifts in the morning and afternoon.

So Kon Po is in Primary One Admission (POA) School Net 12. Within the school net are multiple aided schools (operated independently but funded with government money) and the following government schools: Sir Ellis Kadoorie (S) Primary School and Hennessy Road Government Primary School.

References

 
Causeway Bay